Hudson Place One is a high-rise condominium building in Victoria, British Columbia. Hudson Place One is located at 777 Herald Street in Downtown Victoria.

Background
The high-rise was initially proposed as a 29-storey building, but was scaled down to its current height after facing some opposition at city hall

Features
Hudson Place One has 176 condominiums, and features a decorative crest-shaped structure at the very top that illuminates and changes colours at set times

See also

References

Buildings and structures in Victoria, British Columbia
Residential condominiums in Canada
Residential buildings completed in 2020